John Frederick (Fred) Walsh (21 April 1893 – 29 April 1968) was an Australian politician who represented the South Australian House of Assembly seats of Thebarton from 1942 to 1956 and West Torrens from 1956 to 1965 for the Labor Party.

References

 

1893 births
1968 deaths
Members of the South Australian House of Assembly
Australian Labor Party members of the Parliament of South Australia
20th-century Australian politicians